Colpach-Bas is a village in the commune of Ell, in western Luxembourg.  , the village has a population of 105.

Colpach Castle dates from the beginning of the 14th century when it was a stronghold. It was adapted as a manor house in the 18th century. Today it is a convalescent centre run by the Red Cross.

References

Redange (canton)
Villages in Luxembourg